This is a list of foreign ministers in 2007.

Africa
 Algeria –
Mohammed Bedjaoui (2005–2007)
Mourad Medelci (2007–2013)
 Angola – João Bernardo de Miranda (1999–2008)
 Benin –
Mariam Aladji Boni Diallo (2006–2007)
Moussa Okanla (2007–2008)
 Botswana – Mompati Merafhe (1994–2008)
 Burkina Faso –
Youssouf Ouédraogo (1999–2007)
Djibril Bassolé (2007–2008)
 Burundi – Antoinette Batumubwira (2005–2009)
 Cameroon –
Jean-Marie Atangana Mebara (2006–2007)
Henri Eyebe Ayissi (2007–2011)
 Cape Verde – Víctor Borges (2004–2008)
 Central African Republic – Côme Zoumara (2006–2008)
 Chad – Ahmad Allam-Mi (2005–2008)
 Comoros – Ahmed Ben Said Jaffar (2006–2010)
 Republic of Congo –
Rodolphe Adada (1997–2007)
Basile Ikouébé (2007–2015)
 Democratic Republic of Congo –
 Raymond Ramazani Baya (2004–2007)
 Antipas Mbusa Nyamwisi (2007–2008)
 Côte d'Ivoire – Youssouf Bakayoko (2006–2010)
 Djibouti – Mahamoud Ali Youssouf (2005–present)
 Egypt – Ahmed Aboul Gheit (2004–2011)
 Equatorial Guinea – Pastor Micha Ondó Bile (2003–2012)
 Eritrea –
Mohamed Omer (acting) (2005–2007)
Osman Saleh Mohammed (2007–present)
 Ethiopia – Seyoum Mesfin (1991–2010)
 Gabon – Jean Ping (1999–2008)
 The Gambia –
Bala Garba Jahumpa (2006–2007)
Crispin Grey-Johnson (2007–2008)
 Ghana –
Nana Akufo-Addo (2003–2007)
Akwasi Osei-Adjei (2007–2009)
 Guinea –
Mamady Condé (2006–2007)
Kabèlè Abdoul Camara (2007–2008)
 Guinea-Bissau –
António Isaac Monteiro (2005–2007)
Maria da Conceição Nobre Cabral (2007–2009)
 Kenya – Raphael Tuju (2005–2008)
 Lesotho –
Monyane Moleleki (2004–2007)
Mohlabi Tsekoa (2007–2015)
 Liberia –
George Wallace (2006–2007)
Olubanke King-Akerele (2007–2010)
 Libya – Abdel Rahman Shalgham (2000–2009)
 Madagascar – Marcel Ranjeva (2002–2009)
 Malawi – Joyce Banda (2006–2009)
 Mali –  Moctar Ouane (2004–2011)
 Mauritania –
Ahmed Ould Sid'Ahmed (2005–2007)
Mohamed Saleck Ould Mohamed Lemine (2007–2008)
 Mauritius – Madan Dulloo (2005–2008)
 Morocco –
Mohamed Benaissa (1999–2007)
Taieb Fassi Fihri (2007–2012)
 Western Sahara – Mohamed Salem Ould Salek (1998–2023)
 Mozambique – Alcinda Abreu (2005–2008)
 Namibia – Marco Hausiku (2004–2010)
 Niger – Aïchatou Mindaoudou (2001–2010)
 Nigeria –
Joy Ogwu (2006–2007)
Ojo Maduekwe (2007–2010)
 Rwanda – Charles Murigande (2002–2008)
 São Tomé and Príncipe –
Carlos Gustavo dos Anjos (2006–2007)
Ovídio Manuel Barbosa Pequeno (2007–2008)
 Senegal – Cheikh Tidiane Gadio (2000–2009)
 Seychelles – Patrick Pillay (2005–2009)
 Sierra Leone –
 Momodu Koroma (2002–2007)
 Zainab Bangura (2007–2010)
 Somalia –
Ismail Mahmud Hurre (2006–2007)
Hussein Elabe Fahiye (2007)
Muhammad Ali Hamoud (2007–2008)
 Somaliland – Abdillahi Mohamed Duale (2006–2010)
 Puntland – Ali Abdi Aware (2007–2008)
 South Africa – Nkosazana Dlamini-Zuma (1999–2009)
 Sudan –
 Lam Akol (2005–2007)
 Deng Alor (2007–2010)
 Swaziland – Moses Mathendele Dlamini (2006–2008)
 Tanzania –
 Asha-Rose Migiro (2006–2007)
 Bernard Membe (2007–2015)
 Togo –
Zarifou Ayéva (2005–2007)
Léopold Gnininvi (2007–2008)
 Tunisia – Abdelwahab Abdallah (2005–2010)
 Uganda – Sam Kutesa (2005–2021)
 Zambia –
Mundia Sikatana (2006–2007)
Kabinga Pande (2007–2011)
 Zimbabwe – Simbarashe Mumbengegwi (2005–2017)

Asia
 Afghanistan – Rangin Dadfar Spanta (2006–2010)
 Armenia – Vartan Oskanian (1998–2008)
 Azerbaijan – Elmar Mammadyarov (2004–2020)
 Nagorno-Karabakh – Georgy Petrosyan (2005–2011)
 Bahrain – Sheikh Khalid ibn Ahmad Al Khalifah (2005–2020)
 Bangladesh –
 Iajuddin Ahmed (2006–2007)
 Fakhruddin Ahmed (2007)
 Iftekhar Ahmed Chowdhury (2007–2009)
 Bhutan –
Khandu Wangchuk (2003–2007)
Yeshey Dorji (acting) (2007–2008)
 Brunei – Pengiran Muda Mohamed Bolkiah (1984–2015)
 Cambodia – Hor Namhong (1998–2016)
 China –
 Li Zhaoxing (2003–2007)
 Yang Jiechi (2007–2013)
 East Timor –
 José Luís Guterres (2006–2007)
 Adalgisa Magno Guterres (acting) (2007)
 Zacarias da Costa (2007–2012)
 Georgia – Gela Bezhuashvili (2005–2008)
 Abkhazia – Sergei Shamba (2004–2010)
 South Ossetia – Murat Dzhioyev (1998–2012)
 India – Pranab Mukherjee (2006–2009)
 Indonesia – Hassan Wirajuda (2001–2009)
 Iran – Manouchehr Mottaki (2005–2010)
 Iraq – Hoshyar Zebari (2003–2014)
 Kurdistan – Falah Mustafa Bakir (2006–2019)
 Israel – Tzipi Livni (2006–2009)
 Palestinian Authority –
 Mahmoud al-Zahar (2006–2007)
 Ziad Abu Amr (2007)
 Salam Fayyad (2007)
 Riyad al-Maliki (2007–present)
 Japan –
Taro Aso (2005–2007)
Nobutaka Machimura (2007)
Masahiko Kōmura (2007–2008)
 Jordan –
Abdul Ilah Khatib (2005–2007)
Salah Bashir (2007–2009)
 Kazakhstan –
 Kassym-Jomart Tokayev (2002–2007)
 Marat Tazhin (2007–2009)
 North Korea –
 Paek Nam-sun (1998–2007)
 Kang Sok-ju (acting) (2007)
 Pak Ui-chun (2007–2014)
 South Korea – Song Min-soon (2006–2008)
 Kuwait – Sheikh Mohammad Sabah Al-Salem Al-Sabah (2003–2011)
 Kyrgyzstan –
 Alikbek Jekshenkulov (2005–2007)
 Ednan Karabayev (2007–2009)
 Laos – Thongloun Sisoulith (2006–2016)
 Lebanon – 
Fawzi Salloukh (2005–2009)
Tarek Mitri (acting) (2006–2008)
 Malaysia – Syed Hamid Albar (1999–2008)
 Maldives –
Ahmed Shaheed (2005–2007)
Abdullah Shahid (2007–2008)
 Mongolia –
Nyamaa Enkhbold (2006–2007)
Sanjaasürengiin Oyuun (2007–2008)
 Myanmar – Nyan Win (2004–2011)
 Nepal –
Khadga Prasad Oli (2006–2007)
Sahana Pradhan (2007–2008)
 Oman – Yusuf bin Alawi bin Abdullah (1982–2020)
 Pakistan –
Khurshid Mahmud Kasuri (2002–2007)
Inam-ul-Haq (2007–2008)
 Philippines – Alberto Romulo (2004–2011)
 Qatar – Sheikh Hamad bin Jassim bin Jaber Al Thani (1992–2013)
 Saudi Arabia – Prince Saud bin Faisal bin Abdul Aziz (1975–2015)
 Singapore – George Yeo (2004–2011)
 Sri Lanka –
 Mangala Samaraweera (2005–2007)
 Rohitha Bogollagama (2007–2010)
 Syria – Walid Muallem (2006–2020)
 Taiwan – James C. F. Huang (2006–2008)
 Tajikistan – Khamrokhon Zaripov (2006–2013)
 Thailand – Nitya Pibulsonggram (2006–2008)
 Turkmenistan – Raşit Meredow (2001–present)
 United Arab Emirates – Sheikh Abdullah bin Zayed Al Nahyan (2006–present)
 Uzbekistan – Vladimir Norov (2006–2010)
 Vietnam – Phạm Gia Khiêm (2006–2011)
 Yemen – Abu Bakr al-Qirbi (2001–2014)

Europe
 Albania –
 Besnik Mustafaj (2005–2007)
 Lulzim Basha (2007–2009)
 Andorra –
 Juli Minoves Triquell (2001–2007)
 Meritxell Mateu i Pi (2007–2009)
 Austria – Ursula Plassnik (2004–2008)
 Belarus – Sergei Martynov (2003–2012)
 Belgium – Karel De Gucht (2004–2009)
 Brussels-Capital Region – Guy Vanhengel (2000–2009)
 Flanders – Geert Bourgeois (2004–2008)
 Wallonia – Marie-Dominique Simonet (2004–2009)
 Bosnia and Herzegovina –
 Mladen Ivanić (2003–2007)
 Sven Alkalaj (2007–2012)
 Bulgaria – Ivailo Kalfin (2005–2009)
 Croatia – Kolinda Grabar-Kitarović (2005–2008)
 Cyprus –
Giorgos Lillikas (2006–2007)
Erato Kozakou-Marcoullis (2007–2008)
 Northern Cyprus – Turgay Avcı (2006–2009)
 Czech Republic –
 Alexandr Vondra (2006–2007)
 Karel Schwarzenberg (2007–2009)
 Denmark – Per Stig Møller (2001–2010)
 Greenland –
 Josef Motzfeldt (2003–2007)
 Lars Emil Johansen (2007)
 Aleqa Hammond (2007–2008)
 Estonia – Urmas Paet (2005–2014)
 Finland –
 Erkki Tuomioja (2000–2007)
 Ilkka Kanerva (2007–2008)
 France –
 Philippe Douste-Blazy (2005–2007)
 Bernard Kouchner (2007–2010)
 Germany – Frank-Walter Steinmeier (2005–2009)
 Greece – Dora Bakoyannis (2006–2009)
 Hungary – Kinga Göncz (2006–2009)
 Iceland –
Valgerður Sverrisdóttir (2006–2007)
Ingibjörg Sólrún Gísladóttir (2007–2009)
 Ireland – Dermot Ahern (2004–2008)
 Italy – Massimo D'Alema (2006–2008)
 Latvia –
Artis Pabriks (2004–2007)
Helēna Demakova (acting) (2007)
Māris Riekstiņš (2007–2010)
 Liechtenstein – Rita Kieber-Beck (2005–2009)
 Lithuania – Petras Vaitiekūnas (2006–2008)
 Luxembourg – Jean Asselborn (2004–present)
 Macedonia – Antonio Milošoski (2006–2011)
 Malta – Michael Frendo (2004–2008)
 Moldova – Andrei Stratan (2004–2009)
 Transnistria – Valeriy Litskai (2000–2008)
 Monaco –
 Henri Fissore (2006–2007)
 Jean Pastorelli (2007–2008)
 Montenegro – Milan Roćen (2006–2012)
 Netherlands –
 Ben Bot (2003–2007)
 Maxime Verhagen (2007–2010)
 Norway – Jonas Gahr Støre (2005–2012)
 Poland –
 Anna Fotyga (2006–2007)
 Radosław Sikorski (2007–2014)
 Portugal – Luís Amado (2006–2011)
 Romania –
 Mihai Răzvan Ungureanu (2004–2007)
 Călin Popescu-Tăriceanu (acting) (2007)
 Adrian Cioroianu (2007–2008)
 Russia – Sergey Lavrov (2004–present)
 San Marino – Fiorenzo Stolfi (2006–2008)
 Serbia –
 Vuk Drašković (2004–2007)
 Vuk Jeremić (2007–2012)
 Slovakia – Ján Kubiš (2006–2009)
 Slovenia – Dimitrij Rupel (2004–2008)
 Spain – Miguel Ángel Moratinos (2004–2010)
 Sweden – Carl Bildt (2006–2014)
 Switzerland – Micheline Calmy-Rey (2003–2011)
 Turkey –
 Abdullah Gül (2003–2007)
 Ali Babacan (2007–2009)
 Ukraine –
 Borys Tarasyuk (2005–2007)
 Volodymyr Ohryzko (acting) (2007)
 Arseniy Yatsenyuk (2007)
 Volodymyr Ohryzko (2007–2009)
 United Kingdom –
Margaret Beckett (2006–2007)
David Miliband (2007–2010)
 Scotland – Linda Fabiani (2007–2009)
 Vatican City – Archbishop Dominique Mamberti (2006–2014)

North America and the Caribbean
 Antigua and Barbuda – Baldwin Spencer (2005–2014)
 The Bahamas –
 Fred Mitchell (2002–2007)
 Brent Symonette (2007–2012)
 Barbados – Dame Billie Miller (1994–2008)
 Belize –
 Eamon Courtenay (2006–2007)
 Lisa Shoman (2007–2008)
 Canada –
 Peter MacKay (2006–2007)
 Maxime Bernier (2007–2008)
 Quebec – Monique Gagnon-Tremblay (2003–2008)
 Costa Rica – Bruno Stagno Ugarte (2006–2010)
 Cuba – Felipe Pérez Roque (1999–2009)
 Dominica –
 Charles Savarin (2005–2007)
 Roosevelt Skerrit (2007–2008)
 Dominican Republic – Carlos Morales Troncoso (2004–2014)
 El Salvador – Francisco Laínez (2004–2008)
 Grenada – Elvin Nimrod (2000–2008)
 Guatemala – Gert Rosenthal (2006–2008)
 Haiti – Jean Rénald Clérismé (2006–2008)
 Honduras – Milton Jiménez (2006–2008)
 Jamaica –
Anthony Hylton (2006–2007)
Kenneth Baugh (2007–2012)
 Mexico – Patricia Espinosa (2006–2012)
 Netherlands Antilles – Emily de Jongh-Elhage (2006–2010)
 Nicaragua
 Norman José Caldera Cardenal (2002–2007)
 Samuel Santos López (2007–2017)
 Panama – Samuel Lewis Navarro (2004–2009)
 Puerto Rico – Fernando Bonilla (2005–2009)
 Saint Kitts and Nevis – Timothy Harris (2001–2008)
 Saint Lucia –
 Rufus Bousquet (2006–2007)
 Stephenson King (2007–2009)
 Saint Vincent and the Grenadines – Sir Louis Straker (2005–2010)
 Trinidad and Tobago –
 Arnold Piggott (2006–2007)
 Paula Gopee-Scoon (2007–2010)
 United States – Condoleezza Rice (2005–2009)

Oceania
 Australia –
Alexander Downer (1996–2007)
Stephen Smith (2007–2010)
 Fiji –
 Isikeli Mataitoga (acting) (2006–2007)
 Ratu Epeli Nailatikau (2007–2008)
 French Polynesia –
 Gaston Tong Sang (2006–2007)
 Oscar Temaru (2007–2008)
 Kiribati – Anote Tong (2003–2016)
 Marshall Islands – Gerald Zackios (2001–2008)
 Micronesia –
 Sebastian Anefal (2003–2007)
 Lorin S. Robert (2007–2019)
 Nauru –
David Adeang (2004–2007)
Kieren Keke (2007–2011)
 New Zealand – Winston Peters (2005–2008)
 Cook Islands – Wilkie Rasmussen (2005–2009)
 Niue – Young Vivian (2002–2008)
 Palau – Temmy Shmull (2001–2009)
 Papua New Guinea –
Paul Tiensten (2006–2007)
Sam Abal (2007–2010)
 Samoa – Tuilaepa Aiono Sailele Malielegaoi (1998–2021)
 Solomon Islands –
Patteson Oti (2006–2007)
William Haomae (2007–2010)
 Tonga – Sonatane Tu'a Taumoepeau Tupou (2004–2009)
 Tuvalu – Apisai Ielemia (2006–2010)
 Vanuatu –
Sato Kilman (2004–2007)
George Wells (2007–2008)

South America
 Argentina – Jorge Taiana (2005–2010)
 Bolivia – David Choquehuanca (2006–2017)
 Brazil – Celso Amorim (2003–2011)
 Chile – Alejandro Foxley (2006–2009)
 Colombia –
 María Consuelo Araújo (2006–2007)
 Fernando Araújo Perdomo (2007–2008)
 Ecuador –
 Francisco Carrión (2005–2007)
 María Fernanda Espinosa (2007)
 María Isabel Salvador (2007–2008)
 Guyana – Rudy Insanally (2001–2008)
 Paraguay – Rubén Ramírez Lezcano (2006–2008)
 Peru – José Antonio García Belaúnde (2006–2011)
 Suriname – Lygia Kraag-Keteldijk (2005–2010)
 Uruguay – Reinaldo Gargano (2005–2008)
 Venezuela – Nicolás Maduro (2006–2013)

References
http://rulers.org

2007 in international relations
Foreign ministers
2007